Gazania lichtensteinii (Afrikaans: geelgousblom, "yellow calendula") is one of the flowers known as a calendula, native to South Africa (Western Cape and Northern Cape provinces) and Namibia. On the SANBI Red List, it is listed as "safe".

Description

This annual plant can be either compact and acaulescent, or form longer stems, and reaches up to 20 cm in height. 
Like many other Gazania species, the flowers are yellow and approximately 4 cm in diameter. 

Distinguishing characteristics of this species are the glabrous (smooth) involucres, which are slender in shape with a truncate base that often appears to have clear collar around it. 
The leaves are obovate to oblanceolate, usually 4 cm long. The leaves have dentate (toothed) margins, and a tomentose (woolly) underside.

Distribution and ecology
The distribution of Gazania lichtensteinii extends from southern Namibia, southwards across much of the western half of South Africa, including the Namaqualand, the Tanqua Karoo, the Gamka Karoo and parts of the western Little Karoo. 

It is commonplace in the Succulent Karoo. The small seeds have fluffy tufts that spread in the wind. Young seedlings grow best on rough, barren ground where there is little competition from established plants. Ostriches in particular tend to feed on them.

References

Flora of Namibia
Flora of South Africa
lichtensteinii
Plants described in 1832